The Great Western Business and Normal College (sometimes called "Concordia Normal School and Business College" or "Concordia Business College") located in Concordia, Kansas was a private business college and normal school.  The school was founded in 1889 by L. H. Hausam.  Records show students attending as late as 1930.

The college eventually moved its operations to Webb City, Missouri

Alumni
 Frank Carlson, governor of Kansas

Gallery

References

Education in Cloud County, Kansas
Defunct private universities and colleges in Kansas